Lashgargah may refer to:
 Lashgargah, Kermanshah
 Lashgargah, Khuzestan

See also
 Lashkar Gah